Băieți buni is a 2005 Romanian 8-episode police drama television miniseries which centers on the efforts of two police inspectors (played by Dragoș Bucur and Cabral Ibaka) to bring down a far-reaching criminal network.

Tagline: Legea coboară în stradă (Bringing the law to the street)

Cast

Main cast

Guest stars

Additional cast

Episode guide

Legea coboară în stradă
Aired: 24 April 2005
Edited by: Dan Moga
Written by: Ovidiu Niculescu, Sorin Tofan, Marius Șerbu, Cătălin Rotaru, Minerva Teodorescu, Dan Mușețoiu, Bogdan Mihilescu
Directed by: Bogdan Bărbulescu

Pentru prietenul meu, Francezul
Aired: 1 May 2005
Edited by: Tudor Bota
Written by: Ovidiu Niculescu, Sorin Tofan, Marius Șerbu, Cătălin Rotaru, Minerva Teodorescu, Dan Mușețoiu, Bogdan Mihilescu
Directed by: Bogdan Dumitrescu

Lovește cu furie
Aired: 8 May 2005
Edited by: Tiberiu Teodorescu
Written by: Ovidiu Niculescu, Sorin Tofan, Minerva Teodorescu, Marius Șerbu
Directed by: Theodor Halacu Nicon

Mamutu' versus Beznă
Aired: 15 May 2005
Edited by: Tiberiu Teodorescu
Written by: Ovidiu Niculescu, Sorin Tofan, Minerva Teodorescu, Marius Șerbu
Directed by: Theodor Halacu Nicon

Război pentru Ciupanezul
Aired: 22 May 2005
Edited by: Lulu Supuran
Written by: Ovidiu Niculescu, Sorin Tofan, Minerva Teodorescu, Marius Șerbu
Directed by: Laurențiu Rusescu

Focuri, droguri și femei frumoase
Aired: 29 May 2005
Edited by: Tiberiu Teodorescu
Written by: Ovidiu Niculescu, Sorin Tofan, Minerva Teodorescu, Marius Șerbu
Directed by: Theodor Halacu Nicon

Operațiuni secrete
Aired: 5 June 2005
Edited by: Tiberiu Teodorescu
Written by: Ovidiu Niculescu, Sorin Tofan, Minerva Teodorescu, Marius Șerbu
Directed by: Theodor Halacu Nicon

Legături de sânge

Aired: 12 June 2005
Edited by: Raluca Saita
Written by: Ovidiu Niculescu, Sorin Tofan, Minerva Teodorescu, Marius Șerbu
Directed by: Bogdan Bărbulescu

Title translation controversy
The title Băieți buni (literally Good Guys) clearly refers to the two police officers. In Romania, people rushed to translate the title to Goodfellas, which, technically, is a correct translation. However, due to the connotation of 'mobsters' brought to this term by the 1990 Martin Scorsese picture, the Goodfellas translation is clearly a mistake.

External links 
 

2000s television miniseries
2005 Romanian television series debuts
2005 Romanian television series endings
2000s Romanian television series
Romanian-language television shows
Romanian drama television series
Romanian television miniseries
Pro TV original programming